Collage was a Los Angeles-based music group, best known for their crossover song "Romeo Where's Juliet?".

Career
Collage's debut album Do You Like Our Music?, released in 1981 by Solar Records, was produced by the Whispers. Their next album Get In Touch was typified by the change from disco/funk elements found in the first album to boogie-influenced urban music. Before Collage's departure from the music business they also released album entitled Shine The Light, which also features "Romeo Where's Juliet?".

The "real" success, however, came with the release of "Romeo Where's Juliet?", which was a moderate  hit in the United Kingdom. The single reached number 46 on the British pop chart and number 49 on the US Billboard Hot Dance Club Songs chart.

Past members
Albert De Gracia - Fender Rhodes, piano
Dean Boysen - trumpet, flugelhorn 
Emilio Conesa - electric guitar, acoustic guitar
David Agent - bass
Kirk Crumpler - bass
Larry White - electric guitar
Lee Peters - background vocals, lead vocals
Melicio Magdaluyo - saxophone, flute
Richard Aguon - drums, percussion
Ruben Laxamana - saxophone, vocals

Discography

Studio albums

Singles

References

External links
 Collage at Discogs.

Musical groups established in 1980
American contemporary R&B musical groups
American dance music groups
American boogie musicians
MCA Records artists
SOLAR Records artists
Musical groups disestablished in 1986